Richard Croke (or Crocus) (c. 1489–1558) was an English classical scholar, and a royal tutor and agent.

Early life and education
He was educated at Eton College. He took his BA at King's College, Cambridge in 1510, and proceeded to travel.
He studied Greek with William Grocyn in London and Oxford, and then with Erasmus and Aleander in Paris in 1511. In 1514, he was called to the University of Leipzig, where he remained for some years. Among his pupils were Joachim Camerarius, Hieronymus Dungersheim, who had studied with Croke in Dresden, and Caspar Creuziger. He was replaced by Petrus Mosellanus. As a young man he was identified as a follower of Erasmus, who at this period was constructing his editio princeps of the New Testament in Greek (Basle, 1516).

Career
He was recalled by John Fisher in 1519 to teach Greek at Cambridge; it had been in abeyance since Erasmus's time (1511–1513), and he was Cambridge's second lecturer in Greek. He became Public Orator at Cambridge in 1522, Fellow of St John's College, Cambridge in 1523, and Doctor of Divinity in 1524. He quarrelled with Fisher over college matters in the later 1520s.

In 1529 and 1530, he acted for Henry VIII in Italy, in the matter of the king's intended divorce from Catherine of Aragon; earlier he had tutored Henry in Greek. Croke later tutored the illegitimate Duke of Richmond and Somerset, his son. While seeking canon lawyers to support Henry's side of the argument, he also contacted humanists (such as Girolamo Ghinucci) and sought manuscripts.

On his return to England, he in 1531 became deputy vice-chancellor of Cambridge, and vicar of Long Buckby, Nottinghamshire. A year later he moved to the University of Oxford.

He was a witness at the 1555 trial of Thomas Cranmer.

Works
Ausonius (1515)
Orationes Richardi Croci duos (1520)

Notes

References

Sources
J. Przychocki, "Richard Croke's search for patristic mss in connexion with the divorce of Catherine", Theol. Studies. 1911; os-XIII: 285–295
J. T. Sheppard (1919),  Richard Croke, a sixteenth century don: being the Croke Lecture for the May Term, 1919
Jonathan M. Woolfson (2000), "A 'remote and ineffectual Don'? Richard Croke in the Biblioteca Marciana". Bulletin of the Society for Renaissance Studies, 17:2, 1–11

1480s births
1558 deaths
University of Paris alumni
Alumni of King's College, Cambridge
English classical scholars
English Renaissance humanists
Fellows of St John's College, Cambridge
Year of birth uncertain
Cambridge University Orators
16th-century scholars
16th-century English educators
Classical scholars of the University of Cambridge
Kingdom of England expatriates in France
Household of Henry Fitzroy
People educated at Eton College